Marguerite Feitlowitz is an author and translator whose work has focused on "languages-within-languages" and the way disaster "affects our relationship to language." She is the author of A Lexicon of Terror: Argentina and the Legacies of Torture, a 1998 New York Times Notable Book and a finalist for the L. L. Winship/PEN New England Award, as well as numerous essays and translations.

A vocal critic of the Bush administration's human rights record, Feitlowitz has published a number of articles on the subject in Salon  and The International Herald Tribune 

She is a professor of Literature at Bennington College in Vermont.

Bibliography

Books 

 2011 [1998]. A Lexicon of Terror: Argentina and the Legacies of Torture. Oxford University Press. .

Translations 

 1992. Information for Foreigners: Three Plays. Gambaro, Griselda. Northwestern University Press. 978-0810110335.
 1994. Bad Blood (La malasangre). Gambaro, Griselda. Dramatic Publishing. .
 2014. Pillar of Salt: An Autobiography, with 19 Erotic Sonnets. Novo, Salvador. University of Texas Press.

References

External links
 MargueriteFeitlowitz.com - Marguerite Feitlowitz's Official Website

Living people
Year of birth missing (living people)
Bennington College faculty
American women non-fiction writers
American translators
21st-century American women writers